The discography of Asian Kung-Fu Generation, a Japanese rock band, consists of ten studio albums, one live albums, fifteen compilation albums, seven extended plays, thirty singles and sixty-four music videos.

Studio albums

Compilation/Live albums

Extended plays

Singles

As lead artist

 Notes

As featured artist

Other charted songs

Other contributions

Videography

Music videos

Video albums

References

External links
 Asian Kung-Fu Generation official website
 Nano-Mugen official website
 Asian Kung-Fu Generation discography at AllMusic

Asian Kung-Fu Generation
Discographies of Japanese artists
Rock music group discographies